Albert Mol (3 January 1917 – 9 March 2004) was a Dutch author, actor and television personality.

Life and career
Mol was born in Amsterdam, and was one of the first openly gay actors in the Netherlands. He married Lucy Bor in 1948. The couple had a child the following year, actress Kika Mol, but divorced in 1955.

On 16 March 1998, Mol registered his relationship with his partner Guerdon Bill. Their relationship lasted until Guerdon's death on 17 August 2003. Mol died in Laren on 9 March 2004 from an aneurysm, aged 87.

Books
 Breek me de bek niet open (with Frans Mulder)
 Het doek viel te vroeg
 Wat Zien Ik!?
 Haar van Boven
 Blonde Greet
 Dag dag welterusten
 Mengele broek en pintje billen (autobiographical)

Books on Albert Mol
 Albert Mol (by Tony van Verre)

References

External links

1917 births
2004 deaths
Dutch gay actors
Dutch male film actors
Dutch male television actors
Dutch television personalities
Male actors from Amsterdam
Writers from Amsterdam
20th-century Dutch male actors
Deaths from aneurysm
20th-century Dutch LGBT people
21st-century Dutch LGBT people